The Greater Upper Nile is a region of northeastern South Sudan. It is named for the White Nile, a tributary of the Nile River in North and East Africa.

History 
The Greater Upper Nile region seceded from the Republic of Sudan on 9 July 2011 along with its fellow Southern Sudanese regions of Bahr el Ghazal and Equatoria. The three regions now constitute the Republic of South Sudan.

Geography 
The Greater Upper Nile borders Ethiopia to the east and the Republic of the Sudan to the north. The South Sudanese region of Bahr el Ghazal lies to the west and the region of Equatoria lies to the South of Greater Upper Nile.

Administrative divisions 
The Greater Upper Nile consists of the following states:
 Jonglei State
 Unity
 Upper Nile
 Pibor Administrative Area
 Ruweng Administrative Area

Between October 2015 and February 2020, the region consisted of the following states:
 Akobo State
 Bieh State
 Boma State
 Fangak State
 Jonglei State
 Northern Liech State
 Ruweng State
 Southern Liech State
 Central Upper Nile State
 Fashoda State
 Latjor State
 Maiwut State
 Northern Upper Nile State

See also
 White Nile

References

External links

 
Regions of South Sudan
Historical regions